John Ryan (April 1958 - 7 October 2003) was an Irish hurler who played as a centre-forward for the Galway senior team.

Born in Killimordaly, County Galway, Ryan first played competitive hurling whilst at Presentation College, Athenry. He made his first impression on the inter-county scene when he joined the Galway under-21 team. He made his senior debut during the 1980 championship. Ryan went on to play a key role for Galway for a short period, and won one All-Ireland medal and one National Hurling League medal.

At club level Ryan was a one-time Connacht medallist with Killimordaly. He also won one championship medal with the club.

Throughout his career Ryan made just four championship appearances for Galway. His retirement came following the conclusion of the 1984 championship.

His brother, Éanna, also played with Galway and was a two-time All-Ireland medallist.

Honours

Player

Killimordaly
Connacht Senior Club Hurling Championship (1): 1986
Galway Senior Club Hurling Championship (1): 1986

Galway
All-Ireland Senior Hurling Championship (1): 1980
All-Ireland Under-21 Hurling Championship (1): 1978

References

1958 births
2003 deaths
Killimordaly hurlers
Galway inter-county hurlers
All-Ireland Senior Hurling Championship winners